Chris Donaghue is an American sex educator and therapist.

Personal life
Donaghue identifies as queer.

Publications
 Sex Outside the Lines: Authentic Sexuality in a Sexually Dysfunctional Culture (2015)
 Rebel Love: Break the Rules, Destroy Toxic Habits, and Have the Best Sex of Your Life  (2019)

See also
 Bad Sex
 Center for Healthy Sex
 Loveline
 Sex Box
 Sex Box (American TV series)
 Why Won't You Date Me? 
 XBIZ Award''

References

External links
 
 Christopher Donaghue at IMDb

Year of birth missing (living people)
Living people
American sex educators
Queer men
Sex educators
Sex therapists